William Joseph "Bill" Toti (born January 15, 1957) is a retired US Navy captain, author, photographer and military technology corporate executive. He also served as commodore of Submarine Squadron 3 in Pearl Harbor, Hawaii. He is known for his role in the exoneration of Captain Charles B. McVay III of the World War II cruiser , as well as for his actions during the September 11, 2001 terrorist attack on the Pentagon. He authored the 2022 book, From CO to CEO: A Practical Guide for Transitioning from Military to Industry Leadership.

Family: Captain  Toti born in USA, with Indian family heritage.

Education 
Toti was born in Youngstown, Ohio, and grew up in Campbell, Ohio, graduating from Memorial High School in 1974. He later entered the United States Naval Academy, graduating in 1979 with a degree in physics. Subsequently, he entered the US Navy's nuclear power program and after completing his nuclear power training and submarine school, Toti joined the submarine force in 1980.

Toti attended the Naval Postgraduate School in Monterey, California from 1984 to 1986, graduating with the first group of Space Systems Engineers in 1986. He was nominated by the US Navy for Astronaut Mission Specialist in 1987, but failed NASA vision screening and therefore did not enter astronaut training.

Career Events

US Navy 
Toti took command of the submarine  in January 1997. He deployed with his ship from April to October 1997, during which time the Indianapolis was awarded the Battle Efficiency E and a Navy Unit Commendation, and Toti was awarded the first of his seven Legion of Merit awards for achievement during that deployment. Toti was then called on to decommission Indianapolis only 18 years into its 30-year life, the ship being a victim of the post-Cold War peace dividend. In 1999, Toti became the Special Assistant to the Vice Chief of Naval Operations and was stationed at the Pentagon.

As the United States prepared for its invasion of Iraq, in 2003 Toti organized and led a military exercise that utilized submarines and special forces in a counter-terrorism operation. called "Giant Shadow."  During that event, Toti was featured in the  CBS News program "60 Minutes" in 2003 with correspondent Scott Pelley.

Toti served as commodore of Submarine Squadron 3 in Pearl Harbor, Hawaii from 2003 to 2004.

Toti's final active duty assignment was to establish and serve as the first commanding officer of Fleet Antisubmarine Warfare (ASW) Command, Norfolk, Virginia. During this tour, in 2005 Toti authored a new maritime doctrine titled "Full Spectrum ASW." Widely regarded as a sea change in the method by which naval forces countered submarines, his treatise on the subject also received wide attention internationally. During this assignment, Toti was also called upon by the Navy to defend the use of active sonar for antisubmarine training, arguing for the practice during controversial public hearings near populations affected by the beaching of marine mammals.

Exoneration of Captain McVay 
While serving as commanding officer of the submarine USS Indianapolis (SSN-697), Toti was recruited by the survivors of the World War II cruiser USS Indianapolis (CA-35) to assist in their effort to clear the name of Captain Charles B. McVay III, who was captain of the cruiser at the time it was sunk by Imperial Japanese Submarine I-58, and who had been court-martialed following their ship's sinking.

In response, Toti authored the article on the McVay affair, titled The Sinking of the Indy and the Responsibility of Command published in the US Naval Institute Proceedings in October 1999. Later Toti helped Admiral Donald Pilling prepare his testimony in front of a US Senate committee hearing on the McVay court-martial. McVay was exonerated in 2000. Toti's role in the McVay affair was described in the books In Harms Way by Doug Stanton and Indianapolis by Lynn Vincent and Sara Vladic. As a result, Toti was named an Honorary Survivor by the USS Indianapolis Survivors' Organization in 2005.

Toti's role in helping to clear McVay's name was covered in the 2016 documentary film USS Indianapolis: the Legacy Project, directed by Sara Vladic. The documentary won several awards at GI Film Festivals in both Washington, DC, and San Diego, California. In September 2017, Toti was also featured in a PBS live broadcast titled USS Indianapolis, Live from the Deep, and in 2019 he was featured in the PBS long-form documentary USS Indianapolis: Final Chapter.

Response during the September 11, 2001 Attack on the Pentagon 
Toti was on duty in the Pentagon at the time of the September 11 attack by terrorists who took control of American Airlines Flight 77. Some of his activity during the rescue effort was captured in ABC News video footage of the event. Toti was awarded his third Legion of Merit for his actions following the attack. In October 2001, he received the Legion of Merit from Chief of Naval Operations Admiral Vern Clark for his actions during the attack.  His narrative from that day, titled "Antoinette," was incorporated into the introduction of the 2006 book "Operation Homecoming," edited by Andrew Carroll and published by Random House. A video recording of his narrative was created for the history project titled "Voices of 9.11." He was featured in the 2016 PBS documentary, 9/11: Inside the Pentagon, in the 2020 History Channel documentary "9/11: The Pentagon," and in episode three of the 2021 National Geographic 6-episode docuseries "9/11: One Day in America."  Toti is a lifetime member of the National Eagle Scouts Association, and in 2002 was awarded the BSA Honor Medal by the National Council for his actions during the 9/11 attack.

Industry Career 
In 2006, Toti joined Raytheon as Deputy Vice President of Intelligence, Surveillance, and Reconnaissance Systems. He was promoted to the Vice President of Mission Support Operations in 2009. In 2011, he joined Hewlett Packard as the Vice President and Account Executive of Navy and Marine Corps Accounts, where he led the management of largest network in the world (NMCI). At Hewlett Packard he won the FedScoop 50 Industry Leadership award in 2012.

Toti left Hewlett Packard in 2014 to become president of Cubic Global Defense (CGD). He left Cubic in 2016 to join Hewlett Packard Enterprise as vice president, Defense.  In April 2017 HPE combined with CSC to form DXC Technology, whereupon Toti was named Vice President of the US Defense business at DXC, then as president of Maritime Sensor Systems at L3 Technologies.  In May, 2019 he began service as President & CEO of Sparton, a defense manufacturing company focused on maritime and naval systems, retiring from that position in January 2022.

Author 
In the mid 1990s Toti was assigned as a Federal Executive Fellow at the Brookings Institution in Washington, DC, where he authored op-ed pieces, published in The Washington Post, The Washington Times, The Baltimore Sun, and The Wall Street Journal, mostly on the topic of Asian political-military affairs, particularly as it pertained to the 1996 Taiwan Straits crisis and the Revolution in Military Affairs.

In 1995, Lawrence Korb wrote an article in the magazine Foreign Affairs, titled Our Overstuffed Armed Forces questioning the need for and scale of US defense spending by comparing American defense spending to that of other nations. Toti reacted to this article by writing a rebuttal which was published in The Washington Times entitled What Does Brookings Know About Defense? The article advanced the idea that because of the need of American armed forces to cross two vast oceans surrounding the United States to bring the fight to the enemy, any comparison of what the United States spends relative to spending by other nations that do not have to cross those oceans, is specious. Toti's article was countered by a strong rebuttal on March 19, 1996, also in The Washington Times, written Michael O'Hanlon and Korb, then both senior fellows at Brookings.

Toti authored other articles on the revolution in military affairs during that decade, including a piece titled Stop the Revolution I want to Get Off, which earned him the United States Naval Institute's Author of the Year award in 2000. Toti also wrote the foreword and afterword of a book on the history of the cruiser , titled Ordeal by Sea by Thomas Helm and published by Penguin Books.

In 2022 he released his first book, titled "From CO to CEO: A Practical Guide for Transitioning from Military to Industry Leadership," published by Forefront Books and distributed by Simon & Schuster.  According to the introduction of the book, his stated purpose for writing the book is that, over the course of his fifteen years in industry, he saw veterans who left the military and transitioned to industry make the same mistakes over and over again.  Toti says in the opening of the book that he believes the military's transition training is defective and actually creates problems for transitioning veterans, and his intent is to teach veterans how things really work in industry so they can reduce their level of stress in transition.

Photographer 
In addition, beginning in 2013, Toti began to achieve recognition as a landscape photographer. His photos have been published in Landscape Photographer, Destinations, and N-Photo magazines. He was featured in Nikon Asia magazine, in an article titled Transcending Appeal.  In 2015, Toti published a book of photographs, Safari: Images of African , and his photograph of Tunnel View at Yosemite was published in the National Parks Conservation Association book, "A Century of Impact."

Crimson Tide 
In 1993 while Toti was serving as executive officer (second in command) of the submarine  (SSBN-728) Gold Crew, a group of filmmakers from Hollywood Pictures including Jerry Bruckheimer and Don Simpson embarked in USS Florida to conduct research into the storyline of a movie to be titled Crimson Tide, about another Trident submarine, . Toti helped them in correcting the direction of the plot of the movie. Crimson Tide was released globally in 1995, and Crimson Tide screenwriter Michael Schiffer attended the 1997 ceremony when Toti took command of USS Indianapolis at Pearl Harbor, Hawaii.

Inspired by his relationship with screenwriter Schiffer, Toti then authored a sequel to Crimson Tide, titled The Genocide Game.  The plot-line of The Genocide Game involved Crimson Tide lead character Hunter (played by Denzel Washington), with Hunter, in command of Los Angeles-class fast attack submarine USS Indianapolis, the same submarine which Toti himself would later command. In The Genocide Game, Hunter discovers an Iranian submarine that has been taken control of by Al-Qaeda terrorists, who then use the Iranian submarine to threaten New York City. Toti shared the script with Schiffer, and the two of them collectively pitched this story to Bruckheimer, who rejected the idea of doing a sequel. Toti then entered the screenplay into the Academy of Motion Pictures Arts and Sciences Nicholl Screenwriting Contest where The Genocide Game finished as a 2001 semi-finalist.

Documentaries

Awards and decorations

References 

1957 births
Living people
United States Navy sailors
American photographers
People associated with the September 11 attacks
People from Youngstown, Ohio
United States Naval Academy alumni
People from Campbell, Ohio